This is a list of the main career statistics of professional Swiss tennis player Belinda Bencic. She has won eight singles and two doubles title on the WTA Tour. She made her breakthrough at the age of 18 when she won her first title, the Premier Eastbourne International, and later that year her first WTA 1000 title at the Canadian Open. In 2019, she won Dubai Championships as her second WTA 1000 title. She is also US Open semifinalist in 2019. 

Her contributions to the Swiss team can be seen at the both Billie Jean King Cup and Summer Olympics. At the Billie Jean King Cup she achieved final in 2021 and addition get to two more semifinals before that. Belinda made her Summer Olympics debut in 2021 and won two medals. In singles event, she defeating Markéta Vondroušová in the final to get gold medal, while in doubles alongside Viktorija Golubic get silver medal after losing to Czechs Barbora Krejčíková and Kateřina Siniaková.

In singles, Bencic break into top 10 in 2016 when she was 18 years old. She get to the place No. 7 and then in 2020 reached her new career highest place of No. 4. Due to more focus in singles, she had never enter top 50 but was close, getting to the place No. 59 in 2016.

Performance timelines

Only main-draw results in WTA Tour, Grand Slam tournaments, Fed Cup/Billie Jean King Cup and Olympic Games are included in win–loss records.

Singles
Current after the 2023 Indian Wells Open.

Doubles
Current after the 2023 Australian Open.

Significant finals

Olympic Games

Singles: 1 (gold medal)

Doubles: 1 (silver medal)

WTA 1000 finals

Singles: 2 (2 titles)

WTA Tour career finals

Singles: 17 (8 titles, 9 runner–ups)

Doubles: 3 (2 titles, 1 runner-up)

WTA 125 tournament finals

Singles: 2 (2 titles)

ITF Circuit finals

Singles: 6 (5 titles, 1 runner–up)

Doubles: 5 (3 titles, 2 runner–ups)

Junior Grand Slam tournament finals

Girls' singles: 2 (2 titles)

Girls' doubles: 3 (3 runner–ups)

WTA Tour career earnings
Current through the 2022 Tallinn Open.
{|cellpadding=3 cellspacing=0 border=1 style=border:#aaa;solid:1px;border-collapse:collapse;text-align:center;
|-style=background:#eee;font-weight:bold
|width="90"|Year
|width="100"|Grand Slam <br/ >singles titles|width="100"|WTA <br/ >singles titles
|width="100"|Total <br/ >singles titles
|width="120"|Earnings ($)
|width="100"|Money list rank
|-
|2014
|0
|0
|0
| align="right" |721,411
|37
|-
|2015
|0
|2
|2
| align="right" |1,480,572
|20
|-
|2016
|0
|0
|0
| align="right" |692,229
|45
|-
|2017
|0
|0
|0
| align="right" |130,978
|176
|-
|2018
|0
|0
|0
| align="right" |595,879
|65
|-
|2019
|0
|2
|2
| align="right" |4,113,075
|bgcolor=eee8aa|9
|-
|2020
|0
|0
|0
| align="right" |321,604
|74
|-
|2021
|0
|1
|1
| align="right" |1,132,234
|28
|-
|2022
|0
|1
|1
|align=right|1,283,016
|25
|- style="font-weight:bold;"
|Career
|0
|6
|6
| align="right" |10,583,062
|56
|}

Career Grand Slam statistics

Seedings 
Tournaments won by Bencic are in boldface, and advanced into finals by Bencic are in italics.

 Best Grand Slam results details 
Grand Slam winners are in boldface', and runner–ups are in italics''.

Singles

Record against other players

No. 1 wins

Record against top 10 players
Bencic has a  record against players who were, at the time the match was played, ranked in the top 10.

Longest winning streak

12 match winning streak (2019)

Notes

References

Tennis career statistics